Walk on the Wild Side is a 1962 American drama film directed by Edward Dmytryk, and starring Laurence Harvey, Capucine, Jane Fonda, Anne Baxter and Barbara Stanwyck. It was adapted from the 1956 novel A Walk on the Wild Side by American author Nelson Algren. The film was scripted by John Fante.

While it passed its censors, it was an adult film noir with explicit overtones and subject matter. It walks its audience through the lives and relationships between adults (mostly women) engaged in the "business" of commercial prostitution at a stylish New Orleans brothel. The "boss" is Madam Jo (Stanwyck), who combines toughness with a motherly tenderness toward her "girls." 

As Life magazine explained, "Jane Fonda portrays a grubby, footloose prostitute....just arrived in New Orleans to live in a fancy house where much of the action takes place....to get approval by the Code Authority and Legion of Decency, the movie changes some of the most evil characters into good ones, and at the end justice triumphs, not Jane."

Plot
In the Great Depression, Dove Linkhorn and Kitty Tristram meet on the road in Texas as each travels separately to New Orleans.  They decide to travel together, hitchhiking and hopping freight trains. Dove is hoping to find his lost love Hallie Gerard, and is uninterested when Kitty comes on to him. After Kitty steals from the New Orleans-area café where she and Dove stop for a meal, he leaves her and makes things right with the owner, Teresina Vidaverri. She gives Dove a job at the café and a place to stay while he searches for Hallie. He finds her working at the Doll House, an upscale French Quarter bordello, where Jo Courtney is the madam.

Later it is revealed that, after Jo's husband lost his legs in an accident, she lost interest in him. A lesbian relationship is suggested between Jo and Hallie, who is supported by the owner in pursuing her interest in sculpting on the side. But Hallie still works for Jo as a prostitute like the other women. Hallie is unhappy with her life at Jo's, but does not want to give up her comforts to risk married life when Dove proposes.

Meanwhile, Kitty starts working at the bordello after Jo bails her out of jail, where she had been confined for vagrancy. Since Kitty and Dove appear to know each other, Jo questions Kitty about her past, and learns that she traveled with Dove from Texas to Louisiana. Jo threatens Dove with arrest for transporting the underage Kitty across state lines for immoral purposes and for statutory rape, unless he leaves New Orleans without Hallie. As Dove leaves the bordello, the bouncer, another employee, and Jo's husband beat him viciously. Kitty watches from upstairs.

Kitty helps Dove return to the café, where Teresina cares for him. The younger woman goes back to the bordello to get Hallie, helping her reach the café. When Hallie can't be found at the bordello, Kitty is suspected and put under pressure; frightened, she brings Jo and her three henchmen to the café. During the ensuing struggle among the men, Hallie is shot and killed by a stray bullet. On the front-page of a newspaper about Kitty's testimony, Jo and several others are arrested.

Cast

 Laurence Harvey as Dove Linkhorn
 Capucine as Hallie Gerard
 Jane Fonda as Kitty "Twist" Tristram
 Anne Baxter as Teresina Vidaverri
 Barbara Stanwyck as Jo Courtney
 Joanna Moore as Miss Precious
 Richard Rust as Oliver
 Karl Swenson as Schmidt
 Don "Red" Barry as Dockery
 Juanita Moore as Mama
 John Anderson as Preacher
 Ken Lynch as Frank Bonito
 Todd Anderson as Lt. Omar Stroud

Production
Tensions among the actors and director caused problems on the set. After Harvey told Capucine she couldn't act, she sulked for a week.  His opinion was seconded by actress Joan Perry, widow of studio head Harry Cohn, but the film's producer Charles Feldman continued to promote Capucine, his live-in girlfriend. This and other incidents, including Jane Fonda's insistence on changing dialogue, eventually resulted in the director's resigning. The film's schedule slipped, causing difficulties for co-star Anne Baxter, six months pregnant when the production wrapped. Baxter described these events in her autobiography Intermission (1976).

Although largely filmed in New Orleans, it features scenes from the Thousand Oaks Meat Locker on what is now Thousand Oaks Boulevard in Thousand Oaks, California.

Tom cat title sequences
The opening titles and closing sequence were designed by Saul Bass, probably in collaboration with Elaine Makatura Bass. Film reviewers universally praised the Bass titles, while often condemning the film. Even director Edward Dmytryk acknowledged that the titles were a masterpiece. The titles feature a black tom cat, filmed at ground level, prowling an urban landscape and picking a fight with a white cat. Bass claimed the cat's journey was a metaphor for the environment of poverty and despair, experienced by the film's characters.  At film's end, Bass filmed the same black tom cat walking over a newspaper headline, whose front-page story reported that the people who ran the bordello were arrested and sentenced to many years in prison, an ending demanded by the Motion Picture Production Code to appease those offended by the film's subject matter.

Reception

Bosley Crowther of the New York Times was not approving: "Everything in this sluggish picture...smacks of sentimentality and social naiveté. It is incredible that anything as foolish would be made in this day and age....There is ever so slight a suggestion that the prostitute portrayed by Capucine is admired by the madam of the bordello, played by Barbara Stanwyck. But that this is any more than the admiration of the employer for a highly productive employe is a thing that only the most susceptible to press-agentry might suspect."

Awards and honors
The film's title song, "Walk on the Wild Side", was nominated for an Academy Award in the category of Best Music, Original Song. Elmer Bernstein, composer, and Mack David, lyricist, shared the nomination.

The film is recognized by American Film Institute in these lists:
 2005: AFI's 100 Years of Film Scores – Nominated

See also
 List of American films of 1962

References

External links
 
 
 
 
 

1962 films
1962 drama films
1962 LGBT-related films
American drama films
American LGBT-related films
American black-and-white films
Columbia Pictures films
Films scored by Elmer Bernstein
Films about prostitution in the United States
Films based on American novels
Films directed by Edward Dmytryk
Films set in the 1930s
Films set in New Orleans
Films shot in New Orleans
Films with screenplays by Ben Hecht
1960s English-language films
1960s American films